Ould Daddah may refer to one of two Mauritanian political figures:

Moktar Ould Daddah (1924–2003), president from 1960 to 1978
Ahmed Ould Daddah (born 1942), half-brother of Moktar Ould Daddah, economist, politician, and civil servant